Laisamis Constituency is an electoral constituency in Kenya. It is one of four constituencies in Marsabit County.  The entire constituency is located within Marsabit County Council area. The constituency was established for the 1988 elections. Formally known as Marsabit South, it was represented by Hon. Phillip Kurungu in the 1966 elections. From 1969-1988 Laisamis Constituency was represented by Hon. Haji Kholkhale Adichareh. Hon. Adichareh was a Lancaster House Conference delegate and was a fierce defender of Rendille land. He served 7 years at Shimo La Tewa prison on trumped up charges and emerge to lead his Rendille community for 20 years in parliament.

Members of Parliament

Locations and wards

References

External links 
Map of the constituency

Constituencies of Marsabit County
Constituencies in Eastern Province (Kenya)
1988 establishments in Kenya
Constituencies established in 1988